Nutty Professor II: The Klumps (Original Motion Picture Soundtrack) is the soundtrack to the 2000 film, Nutty Professor II: The Klumps. Released by Def Jam Recordings, the soundtrack is mainly composed of hip hop and R&B songs. Three singles, Jay-Z's "Hey Papi", Janet Jackson's "Doesn't Really Matter" and Musiq's "Just Friends (Sunny)" appear on this album. British R&B group Honeyz produced the song "Not Even Gonna Trip" for the original soundtrack for the movie.

Track listing

Year-end charts

Certifications

References

2000 albums
Def Jam Recordings soundtracks
Albums produced by Tim & Bob
Hip hop soundtracks